The FIL European Luge Championships 1938 took place in Salzburg, Austria under the auspices of the Fédération Internationale de Bobsleigh et de Tobogganing (FIBT - International Bobsleigh and Tobogganing Federation in ) under their "Section de Luge", a trend that would continue until the International Luge Federation (FIL) was formed in 1957.

Men's singles

Tietze won his fourth straight championship in this event.

Women's singles

Men's doubles

Medal table

References
Men's doubles European champions
Men's singles European champions
Women's singles European champions

FIL European Luge Championships
1938 in luge
Luge in Austria
1938 in Austrian sport